Elizabeth Dore (1946-2022) was a professor of Latin American Studies, specialising in class, race, gender and ethnicity, with a focus on modern history. She was professor emerita of Modern Languages and Linguistics at the University of Southampton, and had a PhD from Columbia University.

She was Project Director of the Oral History Project 'Memories of the Cuban Revolution' and wrote extensively on Cuban history and politics.

Selected publications
The Peruvian Mining Industry: Growth, Stagnation, And Crisis (Westview, 1988; Routledge, 2019)
Gender Politics in Latin America: Debates in Theory and Practice (Edited, Monthly Review Press, 1997)
Hidden Histories of Gender and the State in Latin America (Edited with Maxine Molyneux, Duke University Press, 2000)
Myths of modernity: Peonage and Patriarchy in Nicaragua (Duke University Press, 2006)
Cuban Lives: What Difference Did a Revolution Make? (Verso, 2017)
How Things Fall Apart: What Happened to the Cuban Revolution (Apollo, 2022)

References 

Living people
Columbia Graduate School of Arts and Sciences alumni
Academics of the University of Southampton
British historians
British women historians
Historians of Latin America
1946 births